Deimantė Rimkutė (born 29 June 1998) is a Lithuanian politician who has been serving as a Vilnius City Councillor since April, 2019.

Biography 

Deimantė Rimkutė graduated from Vilnius Jonas Basanavičius gymnasium in 2017 and became a Vilnius University law student. She is among the top 5% of students of her generation.

Since her teen years, Rimkutė has volunteered in Lithuanian and international NGOs: since 2014 she is a member of Lithuanian Liberal Youth, in 2016–2017 she was a chairwoman of Vilnius Liberal Youth Organisation. Since 2018 she is a Bureau Member (Campaigns and Training Officer) of European Liberal Youth. In autumn of 2018, she has also joined Vilnius branch of European Law Students' Association.

She took part in 2019 Vilnius municipal elections with liberal Remigijus Šimašius's list "For Vilnius, which we are proud of!" getting elected with 16,207 personal votes (the 2nd-best result in Vilnius and the 4th in Lithuania). Since June, 2019, she is a Freedom Party board member.

Deimantė Rimkutė speaks English and is interested in law, political philosophy, European politics, travelling and writing articles for media.
In 2016 she was awarded with The Duke of Edinburgh's Award bronze. In 2018 she collaborated on European Liberal Forum monography.

References

External links 
 Biography in Lithuanian (vrk.lt)

1998 births
Living people
21st-century Lithuanian politicians
21st-century Lithuanian women politicians
Politicians from Vilnius
Freedom Party (Lithuania) politicians